This was the first edition of the event

Tomás Carbonell and Francisco Roig won in the final 7–5, 6–3, against Tom Kempers and Jack Waite.

Seeds

  Tomás Carbonell /  Francisco Roig (champions)
  Sergio Casal /  Emilio Sánchez (first round)
  Hendrik Jan Davids /  Piet Norval (quarterfinals)
  Libor Pimek /  Byron Talbot (first round)

Draw

Draw

External links
Draw

Doubles